Le Vaudreuil is a commune in the Eure department in Normandy in northern France.

On 15 April 1969 the commune of Notre-Dame-du-Vaudreuil was joined with that of Saint-Cyr-du-Vaudreuil to form the present Le Vaudreuil.

A bronze statue of the deputy Edgar Raoul-Duval was erected in 1890 in Notre-Dame-du-Vaudreuil.

Population

International relations

Le Vaudreuil is twinned with Comberton, United Kingdom.

See also
Communes of the Eure department

References

External links

 Official site of Le Vaudreuil
 Kite Aerial Photographies of Le Vaudreuil

Communes of Eure